Guilford Township is one of the seventeen townships of Medina County, Ohio, United States.  The 2000 census found 5,447 people in the township, 3,181 of whom lived in the unincorporated portions of the township.

Geography
Located in the southern part of the county, it borders the following townships:
Montville Township - north
Sharon Township - northeast corner
Wadsworth Township - east
Milton Township, Wayne County - south
Canaan Township, Wayne County - southwest corner
Westfield Township - west
Lafayette Township - northwest corner

Two municipalities are located in Guilford Township: part of the city of Rittman in the southeast, and the village of Seville in the west.

Name and history
It is the only Guilford Township statewide.
Derived from Guildford, Surrey a small market town in England.

Government
The township is governed by a three-member board of trustees, who are elected in November of odd-numbered years to a four-year term beginning on the following January 1. Two are elected in the year after the presidential election and one is elected in the year before it. There is also an elected township fiscal officer, who serves a four-year term beginning on April 1 of the year after the election, which is held in November of the year before the presidential election. Vacancies in the fiscal officership or on the board of trustees are filled by the remaining trustees.

References

External links
County website

Townships in Medina County, Ohio
Townships in Ohio